Thomas Cooper (died 1659) was a colonel in the Parliamentary Army who fought in the English Civil War and aided in the Cromwellian occupation of Ireland. He was appointed to the Cromwell's Upper House, and died in 1659.

Cooper was of an ancient and respectable family in Oxfordshire, which had possessed the manor of South Weston, with other estates in that county for several centuries; he was an alderman of Oxford, which place he represented in the Short Parliament called by King Charles I in 1640, with Lord Howard; but that assembly, having been most imprudently dissolved, he was again returned to the Long Parliament. He rose in the Parliament army to the rank of Colonel of foot, and accompanied Oliver Cromwell into Scotland in 1651. He afterwards was sent into Ireland. In 1656, he was one of the representatives of the counties of Down, Antrim, and Armagh, in the latter kingdom. Some time after the initial nominations, he accepted the nomination as a lord in Cromwell's Upper House. His name is under the order for proclaiming Richard Cromwell Protector. What he may have gained during the usurpation was not known to Mark Nobel, who was writing at the end of the eighteenth century,  but Nobel speculated that perhaps it was considerable; for though Cooper was a great sufferer by the restoration of the monarchy, his descendant and heir, Thomas Cooper, Esq. inhered the manor at South Weston, with other properties, in Oxfordshire, of the value of £1000 per annum.

Notes
Footnotes

Citations

References
Clarke, Aidan (1999). Prelude to restoration in Ireland: the end of the Commonwealth, 1659-1660, Cambridge University Press, 1999. , . p.324 Index "Cooper Col. Thomas 33, 58, 60, 62, 69, 94n, 97, 98, 99, 100,1 03, 114-115, 119, 143, 151, 172, 264n"
Conway Anne, et al.(1992). The Conway letters: the correspondence of Anne, Viscountess Conway, Henry More, and their friends, 1642-1684, Oxford University Press, 1992. p. 160 footnote.
Noble, Mark (1784). Memoirs of the protectorate-house of Cromwell: deduced from an early period, and continued down to the present time, Volume II, Printed Pearson and Rollason, sold by R. Baldwin [etc.] London.
Reid, James Seaton (1838).  History of the Presbyterian Church in Ireland: comprising the civil history of the province of Ulster, from the accession of James the First, with a preliminary sketch of the progress of the reformed religion in Ireland during the sixteenth century and an appendix consisting of original papers, Volume 2, Whittaker. p. 299 footnote (12)

Attribution

Further reading
Editors. The Gentleman's magazine, Volume 191 Gleanings from the Irish Council Books p. 1852 Letter from Henry Cromwell to Cooper and others in charge in Ulster over religion
Notes and queries, Volume 11, January–June 1867.  p. 417 pp. 491,492 "Thomas Cooper (3rd S. xi 417.) E. H. C is referred to a statement in Burke's Armory, from whence it appears that Thomas Cooper, Colonel in Cromwell's army, called to the Protector's Upper House in 1658, is now represented by the family of Thomas Beale Cooper, M.D., of Mansion House, Bengeworth, Esq., whose pedigree may probably be found in that author's Landed Gentry. — ; Pingatoris."

1659 deaths
Roundheads
English MPs 1640 (April)
English MPs 1640–1648
Members of Cromwell's Other House
Year of birth unknown